French Camp can refer to:

 French Camp, California, in San Joaquin County
 French Camp, Mississippi